"Santeria" is a ballad by American ska punk band Sublime from their third self-titled album (1996). The song was released as a single on January 7, 1997. Although the song was released after the death of lead singer Bradley Nowell, "Santeria" along with "What I Got" are often considered the band's signature songs.

Composition and context
The song includes the bassline and guitar riff from Sublime's earlier song "Lincoln Highway Dub" off the 1994 album Robbin' the Hood. Santería is an Afro-Cuban religion, practiced in Cuba, South Florida, and exported to other areas in the Caribbean.

The song tells the story of a jealous ex-boyfriend who is planning to take revenge on the man who stole his girlfriend. The man then decides to find a new girlfriend, but expresses his desire to use violence as he describes his plans to "pop a cap in Sancho" and "stick that barrel straight down Sancho's throat" if he ever sees him again, and to "slap her [the original girlfriend] down."  The lead singer of Sublime, Bradley Nowell, refers to the man as "Sancho" and his ex-girlfriend as "Heina". In Chicano culture, a man who steals another man's girlfriend is often referred to as "Sancho" while a man's woman or girlfriend is referred to as "Heina", which is adapted from the word reina, meaning "queen" in Spanish.

Music video
A music video was filmed after the death of lead singer Bradley Nowell, who makes a cameo via stock footage. During the video, his beloved Lou Dog is seen along with the other members of Sublime remembering him. The video was a visualization of the story told in the song in the form of a Western, and featured Tom Lister, Jr. as Sancho. Lister was bitten by Lou Dog on the lip in a particular scene where he gets too close to Lou Dog's face.

Commercial performance
"Santeria" was a moderate U.S. crossover hit, cracking the Top 5 on Billboard'''s Modern Rock Tracks chart as well as reaching number 43 on the Hot 100 Airplay chart. 

Media usage
The song is a playable track on the 2008 video game Guitar Hero World Tour, and was released as a downloadable song for Rock Band 3 in 2012 as well as Rocksmith 2014 in 2014. The song was featured in the films Idle Hands, Knocked Up, Remember the Daze and This is 40''.

Charts

Notes

External links
 

1997 singles
Sublime (band) songs
Music videos directed by McG
1996 songs
Songs written by Bradley Nowell
MCA Records singles
Song recordings produced by David Kahne
Songs released posthumously
Songs about domestic violence
Santería